Gilvánfa is a village in Baranya county, Hungary. The village has an almost entirely Roma population.

External links 
 Local statistics 

Populated places in Baranya County